Domino Master is a casual game based on dominos for Windows and Xbox 360 developed by TikGames and published by Microsoft Game Studios. Domino Master was originally released for Windows 98 in 2004 by TikGames and has been released on September 17, 2008 on Arcade.

The game is available from TikGames for Windows as Domino Master Gold.

Gameplay

Variable difficulty levels: The single player mode features three levels of difficulty for the A.I. players, including Beginner, Master, and Guru, to provide exciting game play for all ages. 
Five game modes: Play Straight, All 3's, All 5's, Bergen, or Mexican Train. 
Leaderboard support: See your name in lights as you check the leaderboards for each game type. 
Multiplayer modes: Play Player Match or Ranked Matches. The ultimate party game comes to life when up to four players compete to see who can become the Domino Master. 
Custom rules: Modify the rules to create your own personal dominos game. 
Multiple domino sets: Choose from double sixes, double nines, or double twelve domino sets.

Reception
Casual Gamer Chick review (XBLA)

References

2004 video games
Casual games
Microsoft games
Multiplayer and single-player video games
TikGames games
Video games based on board games
Video games developed in the United States
Windows games
Xbox 360 Live Arcade games